Heman Luwang (born 1 March 1988) is an Indian cricketer. He made his first-class debut for Manipur in the 2018–19 Ranji Trophy on 7 January 2019.

References

External links
 

1988 births
Living people
Indian cricketers
Manipur cricketers
Place of birth missing (living people)